Vanessa Nicole Marano (born October 31, 1992) is an American actress. She has starred in television movies and had recurring roles in such series as Without a Trace, Gilmore Girls, Ghost Whisperer, Scoundrels, Grey's Anatomy and The Young and the Restless. From 2011 to 2017, she starred as Bay Kennish on the Freeform television series Switched at Birth.

Career
Marano began acting professionally at the age of seven. According to an interview with her sister, her mother did not want either of her children to have careers in show business, and took the girls to an agent that she believed was most likely to turn kids down, only to find that Vanessa was accepted. Her sister Laura, who was on the scene with her, also impressed the agency. Since then, she has worked for productions at the Stage Door Theater. Marano's first major roles on television have been as Jack Malone's older daughter in Without a Trace (she and real life sister Laura play sisters), Valerie's stepdaughter in The Comeback and as April Nardini in Gilmore Girls. She also played Layne Abeley in The Clique based on the books by Lisi Harrison and Samantha Combs in Dear Lemon Lima. Marano starred in an episode of Ghost Whisperer alongside Jennifer Love Hewitt. Marano played Eden on The Young and the Restless and Hope on Scoundrels. From 2011 to 2017, she starred as Bay Kennish on the ABC Family TV show Switched at Birth. In 2013, she starred in Restless Virgins, which was inspired by a true story. 2019 saw her star alongside her sister Laura in Saving Zoë.

Personal life
Marano was born in Los Angeles, California. Her mother, Ellen, is the owner of the Agoura Children's Theatre. Her younger sister, Laura Marano, is also an actress. Marano speaks Italian, and her father is of Italian descent.

Filmography

Film

Television

Awards and nominations

References

External links

 

1992 births
Living people
Actresses from Los Angeles
American child actresses
American film actresses
American television actresses
American people of Italian descent
21st-century American actresses